The Lost Battalion is a 2001 made-for-television docudrama about the Lost Battalion of World War I, which was cut off and surrounded by German forces in the Argonne Forest during the Meuse-Argonne Offensive of 1918. The film was directed by Russell Mulcahy, written by James Carabatsos, and starred Rick Schroder as Major Charles Whittlesey. The film was shot in Luxembourg. It is an A&E Original Movie, premiering on the network in 2001. It is also played on A&E's sister networks such as The History Channel. It was released on home video in January 2002.

Plot
In October 1918, Major Charles Whittlesey is ordered by Major General Robert Alexander to lead roughly 550 soldiers of the United States Army's 77th Infantry Division into the Argonne forest to repel the German advance. Alexander has little faith in Whittlesey, mocking his status as an "overeducated New York lawyer", and describes his men as "acceptable losses"; much to Whittlesey's dismay. Whittlesey's men, part of the American Expeditionary Forces, consist largely of immigrants and poor working class men from the Lower East Side of New York City. He is assisted in command by Captain George McMurty, a veteran of the Rough Riders, and James Leak, an inexperienced lieutenant from Texas.

Whittlesey and his men fight their way through the German line, believing they are going to be joined by American and French forces on their flanks. However, unbeknownst to them, these forces had retreated, leaving the 77th completely surrounded. They are soon joined by riflemen commanded by Captain Nelson Holderman. Whittlesey attempts to send several runners to headquarters, but none return. He uses carrier pigeons to communicate with Alexander, who despite having knowledge of the retreat, orders the battalion to push on. During the siege, American artillery begins falling on the 77th's line, killing numerous men via friendly fire. Whittlesey manages to send a pigeon to headquarters with a message asking the artillery to cease. The barrage ends, but the Germans attack the disoriented Americans. However, the 77th repels the Germans in fierce close-quarters combat.

After several days and numerous repelled attacks, the Americans hold the line despite being desperately low on supplies, forcing them to reuse medical supplies and take food off dead soldiers. The Germans capture Lt. Leak and a wounded soldier, and begin using them to try to negotiate with Whittlesey. Lt. Leak receives good treatment from a German officer who speaks fluent English. He tries to convince Leak that there is no shame in surrender, but Leak indicates his men will never surrender, referring to them as "New York gangsters". The second prisoner eventually agrees to take a message from the Germans to Whittlesey urging surrender after his captor says he wants to save lives. The Germans send him escorted by white flag back to the American line with the message. Whittlesey responds by throwing the flag back towards the Germans, and the Americans continue to hold despite relentless attacks.

Eventually, an American pilot is sent to search for the 77th and flies over their position. Realizing it is an American plane, the 77th make noise to try to get the pilot's attention, and the Germans begin firing at him. The pilot is mortally wounded, but manages to pinpoint the location on his map and navigate back to the airfield. After six days, reinforcements finally arrive at the American lines and the Germans retreat five days later. Major General Alexander arrives to congratulate Whittlesey who is furious about the debacle. Alexander reveals that the battalion's hold enabled the Americans to break through the entire German line. Alexander offers to take Whittlesey back to headquarters in his car, but Whittlesey refuses, opting to stay with his men. Roughly 197 of the 550 men survive the battle.

World War I ends just three weeks later. Whittlesey is awarded the Medal of Honor for his actions, and the "Lost Battalion" gains iconic status.

Cast
 Rick Schroder - Maj. Charles W. Whittlesey
 Phil McKee - Capt. George G. McMurtry
 Jamie Harris - Sgt. Gaedeke
 Jay Rodan - Lt. James V. Leak
 Adam James - Capt. Nelson M. Holderman
 Daniel Caltagirone - Pvt. Philip Cepaglia
 Michael Goldstrom - Pvt. Jacob Rosen
 André Vippolis - Pvt. Frank Lipasti
 Rhys Miles Thomas - Pvt. Bob Yoder
 Arthur Kremer - Pvt. Abraham Krotoshinsky
 Adam Kotz - Col. Johnson
 Justin Scot - Pvt. Omer Richards
 Anthony Azizi - Pvt. Nat Henchman
 George Calil - Pvt. Lowell R. Hollingshead
 Wolf Kahler - Major General (Generalmajor) Freidrich Wilhelm Von Sybel
 Joachim Paul Assböck - Maj. Fritz Heinrich Prinz
 Michael Brandon - Maj. Gen. Robert Alexander

Reception
The film has received generally positive reviews, praised for its historical accuracy, cast, and intense action. Military.com wrote: "The script is compelling on several levels. Whittlesey, the bookish-looking New York lawyer turned soldier, is the Everyman Warrior that viewers enjoy identifying with. Most would like to think that placed in a similar situation they too would find the courage to act as Whittlesey did. Moreover, the movie offers another take on the classic theme that pits an intrepid underdog David against the prohibitive favorite Goliath. As with the Biblical David — but not with Col. Davy Crockett at the Alamo and Custer at Little Bighorn — the underdog prevails here".

BeyondHollywood.com praised the visuals and cinematography for creating a war movie suitable for television without compromising on intensity and action: "The problem with many war films is that after the gore and bloodletting of Saving Private Ryan any war movie looks like an exercise in G-rated filmmaking. The Lost Battalion gets around this problematic obstacle in two ways — it is based entirely on a true story and Jonathan Freeman blesses it with excellent cinematography...The movie is frenetic, chaotic, and completely breathtaking to look at". The review continued that "The Lost Battalion is filled with brutal and personal action that makes you feel like you're there as the men struggle to survive. The movie has immediacy and a sense of claustrophobia as the enemy appears a few dozen yards in front of you, so close that you can see their eyes from your separate positions. The trench warfare aspect of World War I comes alive in bloody color and pale brown dirt".

Awards
The film was nominated for three 2002 Emmy Awards: Outstanding Single Camera Picture Editing; Outstanding Single Camera Sound Mixing; and Outstanding Sound Editing. It won the Motion Picture Sound Editors award for Best Sound Editing in Television (Effects). It won the Christopher Award. It was nominated for the American Cinema Editors award for Best Edited Motion Picture for Commercial Television.

References

External links
 
 
 

2001 television films
2001 films
2001 drama films
2000s English-language films
2000s war drama films
A&E (TV network) original films
American drama television films
American war drama films
Cultural depictions of Charles W. Whittlesey
Drama films based on actual events
Films about the United States Army
Films directed by Russell Mulcahy
Films shot in Luxembourg
Television films based on actual events
Western Front (World War I) films
World War I films based on actual events
World War I television films
2000s American films